Emma Scaunich, but real surname is Scaunigh, (1 March 1954) is a former Italian long-distance runner who specialized in the marathon race.

Career
She won two medals, at senior level, at the International athletics competitions. She participated at one edition of the Summer Olympics (1992) and one of the IAAF World Championships in Athletics (1987). She has 13 caps in national team from 1984 to 1992.

Achievements

National titles
She has won 5 times consecutively the individual national championship.
5 wins in marathon (1989, 1990, 1991, 1992, 1993)

See also
 Italian team at the running events
 Italy at the 1992 Summer Olympics

References

External links
 

1954 births
Living people
Italian female long-distance runners
Italian female marathon runners
Athletes (track and field) at the 1992 Summer Olympics
Olympic athletes of Italy
Sportspeople from Udine
World Athletics Championships athletes for Italy